The 2014 Men's European Individual Closed Championships is the men's edition of the 2014 European Squash Individual Championships, which serves as the individual European championship for squash players. The event took place in Valenciennes in France from 4 to 7 June 2014. Grégory Gaultier won his eighth European Individual Championships title, defeating Mathieu Castagnet in the final.

Seeds

Draw and results

Finals

See also
2014 Women's European Individual Closed Championships
European Squash Individual Championships

References

External links
European Squash Championships 2014 official website

2014 in squash
Squash in Europe
Squash tournaments in France
2014 in French sport
International sports competitions hosted by France